Malaysian registration plates are displayed at the front and rear of all private and commercial motorised vehicles in Malaysia, as required by law. The issuing of the number plates is regulated and administered by the Malaysian Road Transport Department or JPJ.

Latest number plate being issued can be checked through JPJ website.

The following are examples of the formats currently used;

Design 
The current standard for Malaysian number plates were originally derivatives of pre-1932 number plate formats in the United Kingdom, first issued after the introduction of motorised vehicles in the 1900s during British rule. Number plates are typically issued and are formatted similarly for any motorised vehicle that runs on rubber tyres, including most road-legal private, commercial and industrial vehicles, motorcycles, emergency vehicles, and selected heavy equipment (such as agricultural tractors, truck-mounted cranes and backhoe loaders). With the exception of those issued for taxis, vehicle dealers and diplomats, all vehicle number plates in Malaysia have white characters on black background for both front and rear plates, regardless of the vehicle type.

Standards for number plate designs have been defined by the Road Transport Department but are only practiced to an extent. Character size, layouts, and colour use are more strictly enforced for accurate identification and optimum visibility. However, the dimensions of the plates displaying the license number are more loosely enforced. While many vehicles display plates in regulation dimensions or are housed in dealer plate frames with standardised dimensions, some license plates are outlined to precisely fit into vastly larger recessed spaces holding the rear license plates, or appear with reduced or custom dimensions where no proper alcoves exist, as commonly practiced on the front fenders and fairings of most motorcycles and the front of sports cars. 

A compact version of Arial Bold   is currently the typeface preferred by the Road Transport Department, however the department's 'plate number specifications' page features a diagram that also lists "Calisto MT Italic" and "Franklin Gothic Bold". The most commonly used type is a factory manufactured type, but other easy-to-read typefaces are generally acceptable too. Common alternative choices include Charles Wright, which has been used on Singaporean, Hong Kongese, and British plates, and FE-Schrift, which is used on German plates and is thus popular among Malaysian owners of cars with European marques, especially German brands and models. More obscure custom typefaces have also been known to be used primarily on grey import vehicles and aftermarket licence plates.  

Early Malaysian number plates were made of pressed metal, but were largely superseded by plastic plates since the 1970s, with characters either printed on or molded in plastic pieces. The reasons for the popularity of plastics plates in Malaysia were related to cost and metal theft. That said, the disadvantages of using plastic plates include; its fragility; the ease of reproduction which advantages criminals like car cloning syndicates; the yellowing of the letters due to age and exposure to extreme environmental conditions; the letters dropping off due to the reduction in adhesiveness of the glue used to stick the white plastic letters onto the black plastic plate; and the reduction of letter spacing (kerning) in between the individual letters to evade speed cameras and easy identification. This results in an inability of enforcement agencies to identify the correct registration. To combat this, standardised number plates were discussed by the Road Transport Department in 2016, these were to include RFID chips and pressed metal plates. To this end, proposals for standardised typefaces, like JPJ 1, have also been made.

Peninsular Malaysia

Current format 

With the exception of Kuala Lumpur, Putrajaya and Langkawi plates, and taxis, vehicle dealers and diplomats, all Peninsular Malaysian number plates for private and commercial type motor vehicles with the exceptions of those used by taxis, vehicle dealers and diplomats follow a Sxx #### algorithm.

 S - The state or territory prefix. (e.g. : W = Kuala Lumpur, A = Perak, B = Selangor, P = Penang)
 x - The alphabetical sequences. (e.g. : A, B, C ... X, Y. Not including I, O and Z.)
 # - The number sequence. (e.g. : 1, 2, 3 ... 9998, 9999)

The exceptions in the algorithm are as follows:
 There can be no leading zeroes in the number sequence.
 The letters I and O are omitted from the alphabetical sequences due to their similarities with the numbers 1 and 0.
 The letters Z is omitted and reserved for use on Malaysian military vehicles.

The algorithm started with a state prefix and a number sequence which ranged from 1 to 9999. For example, P 1 would be the first registration plate of Penang. Once P 9999 was achieved, an alphabetical sequence was added to the right of the state prefix; PA 1 was the result. When PA 9999 was reached, the number sequence was reset and the alphabetical sequence progressed; PB 1 being the outcome. After PY 9999 was achieved, a second alphabetical sequence was added to the right of the first alphabetical sequence; PAA 1 being the outcome. When PAY 9999 was reached, the second alphabetical sequence was reset and the first alphabetical sequence progressed; resuming at PBA 1.

Variants

Extended Kuala Lumpur series 

As the most registered number plate series in the country, the W series' traditional 7-character format became the first in Peninsular Malaysia to be exhausted when WYY 9999 was reached on 26 September 2013. To allow further W plates, the algorithm was altered to feature an alphabetical suffix behind the number sequence, resetting at W 1 A. When W 9999 Y was achieved, the second alphabetical sequence emerged between the state prefix and number sequence, leading to WA 1 A. When WA 9999 Y is met, the first alphabetical sequence will reset and the second alphabetical sequence will advance, giving WB 1 A. When WY 9999 Y is reached, a third new alphabetical sequence will be spliced into the algorithm, between the second alphabetical sequence and number sequence, resulting in WAA 1 A. The series will end when WYY 9999 Y is reached. The new format would theoretically allow a vastly larger number of registered plates, better addressing the risk of exhaustion of numbers. 

On 18 May 2016, less than three years into the implementation of the extended W series, the Transport Ministry, on the request of the Road Transport Department, announced the tentative retirement of the W series in place of a new V series that would revert to the regular Sxx #### format. The decision was made in response to massive declines in bidding for extended W series plates as the public was gauged to favour a Sxx #### format over Kuala Lumpur's Sxx #### x format. The V series has launched on 1 October 2016 after completion of WD 9999 F and the extended W series was decommissioned.

Langkawi series 

Vehicles in Langkawi, a Kedahan resort archipelago, are issued KV series plates after the islands achieved duty-free status. The algorithm for Langkawi is KV #### x, where KV is the territory prefix with # and x denoting the number and alphabetical sequences respectively. Prior to the KV series, Langkawi-registered vehicles were issued with K series plates as is with the rest of Kedah.

Putrajaya series 

Following the founding of Putrajaya in 1995, vehicle license numbers registered in the territory, in a fashion similar to commemorative vanity plates, originally had their territorial prefix incorporating the name of the territory stylised in oblique Calisto followed by a number sequence of up to four digits (Putrajaya xxxx). The Putrajaya format did not incorporate additional identifiers beyond the four-digit number, limiting the number of available plates for the original Putrajaya series to 9,999 vehicles.

In response to the restrictive format the Road Transport Department began to issue F prefix plates (denoting "Federal") for new Putrajaya-registered plates effective 1 June 2016. 
Both FA and FB were already started issued on 22 July 2017 and 16 May 2018 respectively; and exhausted on 28 August 2017 and 25 June 2018 respectively. FC was started issued since 2 May 2019. Next is FD which was issued on 12 April 2021 and followed by FE issued in April 2022.

History of Peninsular Malaysian registration numbers

Pre-1948 
The registration plate system in Malaysia traces back to the introduction of motor vehicles in the early-1900s in colonial British Malaya, with the introduction by respectable state governments of a basic S #### format, where S prefix is the state identifier. Because the S #### format were not expected to be exhausted for a considerable time, state identifiers were allowed to be represented by one or two letters.

Straits Settlements 

Number plates for the Straits Settlements began to be issued in the early-1900s. With the exception of several format changes in intermediate periods, most of the Straits Settlements state identifiers continue to be used by the territories they were originally assigned to.

The Straits Settlement of Malacca was assigned with the M state identifier, which has continuously been issued on vehicles registered in the state since its introduction over a century ago. The Straits Settlement of Penang originally had two plate series, P and W, which were assigned respectively to Penang island and the mainland territory of Province Wellesley. The Province Wellesley W series was discontinued in 1957 as P plates would be issued for both territories henceforth.

The S series was assigned to the Straits Settlement of Singapore, which continuously used the basic S #### format for several decades until the format was nearly exhausted and subsequently expanded to Sx #### after rationalisation in 1948. Following Singapore's expulsion from Malaysia in 1965, the S series is no longer administered by the Malaysian Road Transport Department, and fell under the responsibility of the State of Singapore Registry of Vehicles and its successor, the Land Transport Authority; vehicles with Singaporean S plates that were under Malaysian ownership were reissued with corresponding Malaysian number plates. In the years following expulsion, the Singaporean number plate system evolved independently with changing prefix systems since 1972, culminating to the reintroduction of the S series for private cars in 1984, the inclusion of a fourth checksum letter, and varied colour schemes for different classes of vehicles.

The L series began to be issued to Labuan in 1906, a then-independent island outpost off the coast of British North Borneo under the British North Borneo Company that would later become part of the Straits Settlement in the following year. The L plate was discontinued in 1963 after the island (now part of North Borneo/Sabah) was reformatted in accordance to North Bornean/Sabahan conventions, and would remain unused until after Labuan's status as a Federal Territory in 1984, when the L series was reinstated for the island.

Federated and Unfederated Malay States 

Due to the initial simplicity of the S #### format, plates in the Federated Malay States (FMS) (Perak, Selangor, Negeri Sembilan and Pahang) and Unfederated Malay States (UMS) (Johore, Terengganu, Kelantan, Kedah and Perlis) originally follow distinct series of state identifiers which may use one or two letters (i.e. SL and KN for early plates in Selangor and Kelantan, respectively).

In conjunction with the formation of the Federation of Malaya, rationalisation of Malayan state identifiers was conducted in 1948 to simplify all FMS and two-letter UMS prefixes into single letters. In addition, the Pahang plate, which originally assumed the P prefix and was allowed to conflict with the Penang plates for decades, was finally reassigned with a unique letter, C. Like the pre-1932 number plate designs in the United Kingdom, the order of the new prefixes also denoted the order of population size of the FMS states at the time, with Perak's A series representative of its then larger population ahead of Selangor (B) and Pahang (C). To prevent future conflicts with plates with the Sx #### format, pre-1948 plates with two-letter state identifiers were subsequently required to be replaced with plates using replacement one-letter identifiers (i.e. PK 1234 to A 1234 and JB 1234 to J 1234), leading to the extinction of the use of double-letter state identifiers in Malaya; a similar change was imposed on pre-1948 Pahang plates. Remaining single-lettered UMS and Straits Settlement identifiers were not subjected to the 1948 change.

Post-1948 
Following the rationalisation of prefixes in 1948, new plates registered in Malaya (and then Peninsular Malaysia) bear a Sx #### format, which was sufficient for use through the 1950s and 1960s. By the 1970s and 1980s, the Sx #### format began to reach its limit in states with higher numbers of new vehicle registrations, leading to an inclusion of a third identifying letter, creating a new Sxx #### format. Selangor becomes the first state in Peninsular Malaysia to adopt the new format in 1971, followed by Perak in 1977, Johore in 1978, Penang in 1979, Kuala Lumpur in 1981, Pahang in 1986, Negeri Sembilan in 1987, Kedah in 1991, Malacca in 1993, Kelantan in 1995, Terengganu in 2000 and finally Perlis in 2018.

The V series plate of Kuala Lumpur, which replaces its predecessor W plates in October 2016, have been reached the Sxx #### format on 12 April 2017, which its become the latest registration plates to reach Sxx #### format after 17 years.

Until 2018, Perlis serial plates becomes only the Peninsular state that have yet exhausted its original Sx #### plate series but finally it have been exhausted on 18 August 2018 and Sxx #### plate series began issued.

In 1974, W series plates began to be reissued for cars registered in the newly ceded Federal Territory of Kuala Lumpur. To prevent conflicts with pre-1957 Province Wellesley plates, the Kuala Lumpur series started at WA 1 as the Province Wellesley series never exhausted the W 1-to-W 9999 range. As Kuala Lumpur was previously the capital of Selangor, vehicles registered there before 1974 are permitted to continue carrying the B series plates.

Being in the economic heart of post-war Malaya and early Malaysia, Selangor's B series was historically the most commonly registered series in the country for decades before it was surpassed by Kuala Lumpur's W series in 1996 (caused by the majority of motor vehicle dealers registering new vehicles at Wangsa Maju RTD/JPJ) and the Johor's J series in 2005 (caused by massive numbers of Malaysians finding employment in Singapore and commuting between Malaysia and Singapore by motorcycles mostly registered in Johor and most Singaporeans who resides in Johor buying vehicle in this state to avoid an expensive COE for vehicles.)

The vast majority of vehicles sold in Malaysia are now registered in the Peninsular. At the end of 2012, a total of 22,702,221 vehicles, including motorcycles, have been registered with the Malaysian Road Transport Department. Of that figure, 5,320,562 vehicles have been registered in Kuala Lumpur alone, with 3,332,767 units being privately registered, four-wheeled vehicles such as MPVs, SUVs, pick-ups and passenger cars. Additionally, a further 1,312,016, 1,226,223 and 1,052,353 four-wheeled vehicles have been privately registered in Johor, Penang and Selangor respectively. Collectively, the four states account for 8,911,154 privately registered, four-wheeled vehicles in Malaysia by the end of 2012. In comparison, 1,465,078 and 1,026,867 vehicles, including non-privately registered and non-four-wheeled vehicles, have been registered in Sarawak and Sabah respectively. Recent data released by Malaysian Automotive Association (MAA) on 30 June 2017, vehicles registered in Malaysia hit 28.2 million vehicles which Federal Territories (Majority of the registered vehicle were issued by Kuala Lumpur) registered most of the cars reaching 4 million cars. The data shows rest of states except Sabah, Sarawak and Federal Territories, motorcycles outnumbered cars on vehicle registration being issued.

Starting 1 May 2014, the border-less registration are now implemented nationwide. This system allows vehicle owners to register the vehicle from desired states and allows slow registered number plates to be registered anywhere regardless according to geographical location. Example of the success of implementation are 
 As of February 2023, Kelantan D (Currently DEP) number plate are issued more in West Coast more than ever, beating Melaka (Currently MDQ) and Negeri Sembilan (Currently NDW). 
 Kapit Division of Sarawak were maintained in QP series from 1991 until late 2014, QPA issued quickly after QP 9999 reached in 2014, it took 23 years for Kapit division to complete QP series; then QPB was issued on 8 May 2018 to 20 December 2021 and QPC was issued on 2 March 2022.
 Perlis R number plate (RT started issued on 23 October 2017 after 2 consecutive months of both RR and RS running. then RU issued 19 January 2018, RV on 28 March 2018, RW on 8 May 2018, RX and RY in 6 July to 18 August 2018).  Many R number plates were registered in Kuala Lumpur. 
 Kota Kinabalu of Sabah SY number plate (SYH started issued on 15 July 2020 after SYG running from 30 June to 8 July 2020)

Border-less registration creating vehicles no longer registered according to states and divisions and they were often registered based onto similarity to more developed neighboring country format. Example are Sabah and Sarawak number plates are very popular in Johor due to similarity to Singaporean number plates also Selangor and Kedah number plates are very popular in Miri due to similarity to Bruneian number plates.

Sarawak

Current format 

All registration plates of Sarawak for private and commercial motorised vehicles with the exceptions of those used by taxis, vehicle dealers and diplomats follow a QDx #### x algorithm.
 Q - The constant prefix for all Sarawakian number plates.
 D - The division (area) prefix. (e.g. : A = Kuching, M = Miri)
 x - The alphabetical sequences. (e.g. : A, B, C ... X and Y)
 # - The number sequence. (e.g. : 1, 2, 3 ... 9998, 9999)

The letters I, O and Z are not used and there are no leading zeroes, as in the case of the Peninsular Malaysian number plates. The current algorithm for the majority of Sarawak's divisions start with the constant Q prefix, followed by the division prefix and the number sequence. An example would be QA 1 of Kuching Division, which was issued in 2004. Once QA 9999 was reached, an alphabetical sequence was added to the right of the division prefix; QAA 1 was the result. When QAY 9999 was achieved in late 2011, a second alphabetical sequence was incorporated and served as the suffix; the result was QAA 1 A. When QAA 9999 Y was achieved on 18 June 2020, the second alphabetical sequence was reset and the first alphabetical sequence was advance; QAB 1 A was the result.

Since 2011, several more divisions have exhausted their respective QDx #### formats. In July 2013, Sibu and Mukah Divisions began issuing QS #### x plates after QSY 9999 was reached. This is followed by Miri Division, which began using the QM #### x format since 20 August 2015, after QMY 9999 was reached. next division to be exhaust the QDx #### format is Bintulu Division which currently being issued QTX ####. Since 19 May 2016, Deputy Minister of Transport introduced V for Kuala Lumpur, There is a possibility that 
Kuching, Sibu and Miri divisions' current algorithm number plates may be supplemented by introducing previously-unused letters to ensure suffix-less registrations become the norm.

The government of Sarawak equip their vehicles with the unique QSG prefix.

History of Sarawakian registration numbers

Pre-1991 

Before the formation of the Malaysia in 1963, the Sarawak's vehicle number plates were originally distinguished only by NDx (N = Number, D = Division, x = Alphabet) prefixes which represented the then five Administrative Divisions in Sarawak, followed by a number sequence which ranged from 1 to 9999; an example would be 1Dx #### for the 1st Division, present-day Kuching Division.

During the 1970s, Sarikei Division and Kapit Division were formed and split from the 3rd Division to become the 6th and 7th Divisions, and were therefore assigned the 6D and 7D prefixes respectively. By the 1980s, the original 1D and 5D prefixes had been gradually exhausted with the passing of time and were eventually replaced by single-lettered prefixes similar to that of Peninsular Malaysia. The 6D and 7D prefixes continued to be used well into 1991.

Post-1991 

In 1991, a new format was adopted in which the suffix Q was moved to the front of the sequence in all Sarawakian number plates. The result is QK 1 which extended to QKY 9999. When the change took place, the SG prefix for Sarawakian government vehicles had been exhausted and an x was later placed in front of the Q suffix, resulting in a format that read SG #### xQ. Kuching Division registration plates were the most numerous in Sarawak and the KT #### Q series was issued halfway when the new QK prefix was enforced. The QA prefix later replaced the QK prefix for Kuching Division.

Restriction of the usage of Q or S suffix 

A quirk of the KV series, present Sarawakian plate format and present Sabahan plate format is the restriction of the use of Q or S as the suffix, justified by possible conflicts with specific older East Malaysian number plates ending with Q or S, specifically the Sarawakian xx #### Q format used between 1988 and 1991, and Sabah's early post-independence x #### S format; measures, however, have been taken to restrict the use of the old Sabahan format to accommodate the W series' use of disused Sabah x #### S numbers. Similar restrictions may be applied for future extended plates for the Johor, Selangor, Kedah and Malacca series due to overlaps with plate formats for Kota Kinabalu (J #### S), Betong/Sri Aman (B #### Q), Kuching (K #### Q), Miri (M #### Q) and Beaufort (B #### S). However, finally present Kuching and Sibu plates follow extended W series format (QAA #### Q, QAA #### S and QS #### Q) instead of the restriction.

Sabah

Current format 

All registration plates of Sabah (except Labuan) for private and commercial motorised vehicles with the exceptions of those used by taxis, vehicle dealers and diplomats follow a SDx #### x algorithm.
 S - The constant prefix for all Sabahan number plates.
 D - The division prefix. (e.g. : A = West Coast, T = Tawau)
 x - The alphabetical sequences. (e.g. : A, B, C ... X, Y, except Q & S are restricted for use)
 # - The number sequence. (e.g. : 1, 2, 3 ... 9998, 9999)

Letters I, O, and Z are not used and there are no leading zeroes, as in the case of the Peninsular Malaysian number plates. Q and S are restricted from being used in the suffix to minimise confusion with the Sarawak's 1988–1991 Sibu Sx#### Q series, and Sabah's early post-independence x#### S format.

The current algorithm for the majority of Sabah's divisions start with the constant S prefix, followed by the division prefix and the number sequence. An example would be SA 1 of West Coast Division. Once SA 9999 was reached, an alphabetical sequence was added and served as the suffix; SA 1 A was the result. When SA 9999 Y was achieved, a second alphabetical sequence was placed to the right of the division prefix and the first alphabetical sequence was reset; the result was SAA 1 A.When SAA 9999 Y was met, the second alphabetical sequences, SAB 1 A was the outcome. However, SY series was started issued on 23 May 2018 after SAC 9999 F exhausted, instead of SAC #### G as a response to introduction of suffix-less V series in Kuala Lumpur. Historically Sabah used E series which the E series bears no suffix, which is similar to number plate algorithm in Peninsular Malaysia. Once SY 9999 was reached, an alphabetical sequence was added to the right of the division prefix; SYA 1 was the result. After SYY 9999 was reaches, the new series has yet to be announced. The West Coast Division encompasses the densely populated cities of Kota Kinabalu and Penampang. The SA series has thus become the most numerous number plate prefix in the state of Sabah.

Labuan, a Federal Territory based on a former Sabahan territory, uses a standard L series based on the Peninsular Malaysian algorithm, unlike the other Sabahan divisions.

History of Sabahan registration numbers

Pre-1980s 

Historically, number plate formats for Sabah, then known as North Borneo prior to the formation of the Malaysian federation in 1963, were similarly revised multiple instances. During Chartered Company rule North Borneo number plates followed a similar format to that of Malaya, but were defined by its own set of regional prefixes based on capitals of the state's then current divisions. However, the old algorithm was quickly exhausted as only combinations such as D #### were possible. Following World War II and declaration of North Borneo as a British Crown Colony, an E was added into the registration number prefix, with new registration numbers issued as ED ####.

After North Borneo's independence from British rule and entry into the Malaysian federation, the E prefix was replaced by an S suffix, altering the format to D #### S, likely as a response to avoid conflicts with the Singaporean E to EZ series used between 1972 and 1984; the S suffix was also added to avoid further conflicts with Peninsular Malaysian formats. The Jesselton (J) division prefix was dropped in favour of an A prefix representing the West Coast Division following Jesselton's renaming to Kota Kinabalu in 1967.

Labuan, which was part of the Straits Settlements and had its own L series plates, fell under the jurisdiction of North Borneo and its vehicle plate reformatted after 1946 in line with the state's number plate formats (EL #### and L #### S).

Despite their obsolescence, delisted ED #### and D #### S numbers, including those using the J division prefix, may still be registered for new vehicles, as it does not conflict with current number plate formats in the rest of Malaysia or Singapore.

Post-1980s 
From the early 1980s, new Sabahan vehicle number plates were issued in the current SDx #### S format.

Following the format change, Labuan plates were issued with the SLx #### S format until a format similar to its original Straits Settlements format, Lx ####, was reinstated in the mid-1990s following Labuan's separation from the state in 1984 as an independent Federal Territory.

In 2017, both Sandakan and Tawau Divisions already exhausted SS 9999 Y and ST 9999 Y respectively; then issued SSA 1 A and STA 1 A series on 20 October 2017 and 19 December 2017 respectively. Sandakan and Tawau are the second and third Divisions of Sabah those have completed two letter format.

In 2018, Kota Kinabalu and Sandakan retired the suffix format by changing to SY for Kota Kinabalu after SAC 9999 F and SM for Sandakan after SSA 9999 A. In 2019, SW for Tawau were issued after STA 9999 A officially retired on February 15, 2019.

Specialised plates

Taxi 

Malaysian taxicab number plates follow a HSx #### algorithm. While based on the Peninsular Malaysian registration plates, taxi plates usually incorporate a constant H (Hire) prefix and have non reflective plates with black characters on white background for distinction purposes.
 H - The constant prefix for all taxi number plates.
 S - The state or territory prefix. (e.g. : W = Kuala Lumpur, P = Penang)
 x - The alphabetical sequence. (e.g. : A, B, C ... X, Y)
 # - The number sequence. (e.g. : 0,1, 2, 3 ... 9998, 9999)

The Kuala Lumpur HW is thus far the most widely issued of all the taxi prefixes, followed by Selangor's HB and Johor's HJ prefixes respectively. Previously taxis in Shah Alam use the HB #### SA format number plate.

The LIMO #### S format was introduced for Kuala Lumpur International Airport (KLIA) limousines following the opening of the airport in 1998. The LIMO prefix is a constant and is followed by the number and state prefixes, such as LIMO 4430 W and LIMO 3864 B. The service of the KLIA airport limousines largely cater to demand in Selangor and Kuala Lumpur. Thus, only the B or W state prefixes are used.

History of Malaysian taxi registration numbers 

Pre-1980s taxi number plates shared the format used for private vehicles based on the state of origin, but with the inversion of colours (black characters on white background). The number plate was also complemented by a Kereta Sewa (English: Rental Car) tag on the roof of taxis.

This old format is widely used on rural taxis in less developed states such as Kelantan and Pahang, but has been widely replaced by the new HSx #### format in the highly developed states, namely Kuala Lumpur, Selangor, Johor, Negeri Sembilan and Penang. However, taxi owners may still choose to opt for either the pre-1980s or post-1980s number plates as both are considered legal and valid. By the end of 2012, there were 39,384 taxis registered in Kuala Lumpur. A further 12,392 and 11,581 taxis were registered in Johor and Selangor respectively.

Foreign missions

Diplomatic Corps 

The registration plates of diplomatic corps in Malaysia are very distinct from other number plate formats in the country. They follow a 1C-2C-DC format and have either white characters on a red background or white characters on a black background. Furthermore, leading zeroes are used in addition to hyphens between the characters.
 1C - The first code denotes the nationality. (see list below)
 2C - The second code denotes a rank. (e.g. : 01 = Head of Mission's Official Car, 52 = Attaché)
 DC - The constant suffix which denotes Diplomatic Corps.

Maybe this is the reason why DC series (DC ####) was restricted, which DD was issued directly after DB was exhausted.

Consular Corps 

The registration plates of consular corps in Malaysia complement the number plates of the diplomatic corps. They follow a 1C-2C-CC format and have white characters on a black background. Leading zeroes and hyphens are also used.
 1C - The first code denotes the nationality. (e.g. : 15 = Australia, 43 = Denmark)
 2C - The second code which is dependent on a Malaysian state and denotes a rank. (e.g. : 01 = Head of Consular Mission in Kuala Lumpur, 02 = Head of Consular Mission in Penang)
 CC - The constant suffix which denotes Consular Corps.

Maybe this is the reason why CC series (CC ####) was also restricted as DC series, which CD was issued directly after CB was exhausted.

United Nations 

Registration plates for vehicles registered under the United Nations (UN) in Malaysia use a 1C-2C-UN format. These plates are issued with white characters on a black background or white characters on a red background.
 1C - The second code denotes an organisation within the UN. (e.g. : 10 = United Nations Development Programme, 11 = World Health Organization)
 2C - The first code denotes a rank. (e.g. : 01 = Head of United Nations Office Official Car, 04 = Head of United Nations Office Personal Car)
 UN - The constant suffix which denotes United Nations.

Other international organisations 

A PA suffix is used for vehicles registered under other international organisations in Malaysia. They follow a similar format to that used for the diplomatic corps.

Military 

For all motorised Malaysian Armed Forces vehicles (including tracked vehicles and various armoured vehicles), number plates numbers with the Z prefix are utilised. Issued in a ZB #### format with white characters on a black background, there are no leading zeroes, and the letters I and O are not used.
 Z - The constant prefix for all Malaysian Armed Forces vehicles.
 B - The branch prefix. (e.g. : D = Malaysian Army, U = Royal Malaysian Air Force)
 # - The number sequence. (e.g. : 1, 2, 3 ... 9998, 9999)

History of Malayan military registration numbers 

The Z #### format is preceded by a ## Zx ## format introduced during large-scale procurement of road vehicles and armored cars for Commonwealth armed forces at the height of the Malayan Emergency, a derivative of the registration plate format for British armed forces vehicles circa the late-1940s and 1950s.

Similar to its British counterpart, the ## Zx ## format was entirely incremental, except the Z designation indigenous to the region. For example, the series began from 00 ZA 01 to 00 ZA 99 before resuming at 01 ZA 00; when 99 ZA 99 was reached, the secondary letter incrementally progressed to 00 ZB 01 (skipping 00 Zx 00), restarting the cycle of numbers. The format may also be bisected in the middle to read as ##Z x##, as commonly depicted on Emergency-era Daimler Scout Cars; it may also be arranged vertically in parts of two where there is little horizontal space, such as on early Land Rovers. Some vehicles used during the Emergency were also registered under the British ## xx ## convention without a Z designation (most commonly the ## Bx ## range) as the vehicles were originally under Britain ownership.

By 1957, the ## Zx ## and ## xx ## formats are rendered obsolete following the introduction of the Z #### format under a new round of rationalisation. The old formats lingered well into the 1960s on a fraction of Emergency-era vehicles handed down to Malaya.

Royalty 

The Sultans of Malaysia, Rulers of States and their immediate royalty use unique registration plates. Most of these official number plates have a yellow background and bear the official title or crest of the owners, such as "Tengku Mahkota Johor" of the Regent of Johore.

Trade plates 
Malaysian trade plates, or temporary number plates, are carried by unregistered vehicles or vehicles without proper documents, such as road tax and insurance, and are largely used by authorised vehicle dealers in the country. Although most Peninsular Malaysian trade plates consistently follow a S #### x format and a white-on-blue colour scheme with leading zeroes for below 100th digits, trade plates in Sarawak similar to normal number plate with white character and red background, whereas those of Sabah follow a ### D prefix and feature red characters on a white background, similar to UK trader's plate. Until September 2013, Kuala Lumpur trade plates followed the usual W #### x format; with the launch of the extended W series that is completely identical in character format, the trade plate format was altered to W/TP #### and W/TS #### for motorcycles. Motorcycles bears trade plate with S suffix, other type of vehicles than motorcycles bears an A suffix for the S #### x format. Although currently Kuala Lumpur issuing V, trade plates are remain unchanged and maintaining W/TP format.

The majority of trade plates are made from pressed alloy, but plastic ones are also commonly used to prevent scratches (usually in black background, technically it is illegal to use plastic trade plate).

Trailer plates 

Articulated lorries or semi-trailers feature two number plates placed at the rear of the trailer. One is designated for the tractor unit, and another for the trailer it pulls. The tractor unit's license number follows standard conventions for motorised vehicles, while the trailer's own number plate uses a T/Sx #### format, with the T/ prefix is a constant for all Malaysian trailers. Both plates have white characters on a black background.

Both states of Sarawak and Sabah didn't issued trailer plates for trailers (T/Q #### and T/S ####) instead trailers in both states were issued standard registration plates like other vehicles.

Commemorative plates 

A limited number of commemorative vanity plates, or plates with distinctive prefixes are made available by the Malaysian Road Transport Department at a higher cost. These special plates may be used to denote the manufacturer of the car, such as the Proton prefix for Proton cars or special events, such as the SUKOM prefix for the 1998 Commonwealth Games.

It was noted that G1M number plates were often abused on luxury vehicles to evade motor vehicle import, excise and sales duty in mainland because G1M series could be registered in Langkawi and Labuan, both islands having duty-free status (motor vehicles registered in both islands are exempted from mainland motor vehicle duties). As a result, numbers under the IM4U series are not allowed to be registered in Langkawi and Labuan.

Booked prefixes/Highest-bidding plates/Meaningful plate prefixes
Unique prefixes such as repeated letters (XXX) became the plates with most bids, starting with AAA issued in 1977, BBB in 1978, JJJ in 2005, CCC in 2007, WWW in 2012, and RR in July 2017 to August 2017; DDD started to be issued on 13 September 2017; PPP started bidding from 5 to 9 November 2020 and starts issued on 26 to 28 November 2020. The most expensive plates as of 2016 is "F 1" which bid at RM836,660, "W 1 N" (similar to "Win") at RM748,000 in 2014 and "WWW 1" at RM520,000 in 2012, both owned by Sultan of Johor which is previously bid the "JJJ 1" plate at RM165,000. "DDD 2" was won by Yang Dipertuan Agong Sultan Muhammad V at RM385,000 shortly after being issued.

In November 2014, plate prefix "BMW" series issued and open for bidding which very popular among BMW owners. "BMW 1" and "BMW 2" were reserved for Selangor Royal Family. "BMW 6" is owned by national badminton player Lee Chong Wei.

In February 2015, plate prefix "RM" issued in Perlis open for bid, which is similar to Malaysian ringgit currency symbol. "RM 1" plate was reserved to Raja Perlis, Tuanku Syed Sirajuddin when "RM 2" to "RM 7" except "RM 5", which belongs to Tengku Amir Shah, Raja Muda (Crown Prince) of Selangor, was reserved to Perlis state EXCO's. "RM" becomes highest-bidding serial plate at more than RM7 million.

In July 2016, plate prefix "F 1" issued in Putrajaya was bid at RM836,660, again by Sultan of Johor. The "F 1" plates, are similar to Formula One acronyms.

Plate prefix  AKU which means me or I am in Malay, were issued in August 2017, with   AKU 1   bidded at RM207,898.90 when   AKU 8055   which means "I'm boss" in Malay, at RM74,000.

Plate prefix  SYG (Sayang) which means Dear or Honey in Malay, were issued in June 2020, with   SYG 1   bidded at RM115,000 when   SYG 8055   which means "Dear Boss" in Malay, at RM19,000.

Plate prefix  PPP were issued in November 2020, with   PPP 1   bidded at RM260,000 when   PPP 9   at RM160,000. PPP 6 at RM140,000. PPP 8999  at RM12,888. PPP 1 and PPP 6 owned by Lee Chong Hoon, brother of national badminton player Lee Chong Wei. PPP serial numbers for vehicle registration which was opened for five days managed to collect the highest revenue at RM7.3 million, surpassing the SYG serial numbers before this at RM3.6 million.

In February 2021, plate prefix KFC issued in Kedah open for bid, which is similar to Kentucky Fried Chicken. KFC 7   bidded at RM52,000, KFC 8   and KFC 9 bidded at RM48,000, KFC 3   bidded at RM45,000.

Among other sought-after prefixes are plates which are similar to Malaysia's political party acronyms, such as MCA, PAP, DAP, PAS, PKR and PKM. Vanity issue  "MM 1" belongs to a former Prime Minister Mahathir Mohamad. MCM prefix are popular on Malaccan government vehicles due to MCM possibly denoting Malacca Chief Minister - and acronyms of states' official names such as JDT can stand for Johor Darul Takzim and KDA might stand for Kedah Darul Aman. The JPJ plates which stands for Jabatan Pengangkutan Jalan, a Road Transport Department's acronym in Malay, were wholly reserved for brand-new Malaysian Road Transport Department's fleet vehicles.

Border crossing

To and from Brunei 
Older Brunei number plates bear similarity to the Malaysian state of Selangor and Kedah number plates which also begin with "B" and "K". The newer Brunei number plates have font shape and size that can easily differentiate them from Malaysian registered vehicles. Although the similarities, Malaysia registered vehicle with number plates "B" and "K" usually allowed to enter Brunei, and vice versa.

To and from Thailand 
Due to the language barrier that arises from the use of Thai and Romanised scripts for vehicle plates registered in Thailand and Malaysia, respectively, road vehicles crossing the Malaysia–Thailand border are typically required to bear stickers in the front and back that translate the characters of the plates into those understandable in the country of entry.

Although this is not a mandatory requirement under the ASEAN Accord for vehicles having Romanised plates, some Malaysian vehicles traveling beyond 50 kilometres of the Malaysia–Thailand border may bear permanent stickers that translate Romanised letters of the Malaysian number plates into Thai, but are otherwise identical in both the use of numerical characters and colour schemes; however, a note to indicate *(STATE)*MALAYSIA* under the vehicle registration is obligatory. The stickers do not have to be removed upon re-entry into Malaysia. Entering heavy goods vehicles from Malaysia are also required to bear a separate Thai Trade Registration Number with yellow plates denoted by the 70-xxxx or 7x-xxxx series.

Entering Thai-registered vehicles, which use the Thai script for series letters and the province of registration on their number plates, are required to bear strips on the front and back that translate the plate information into a row of Romanised script (including the corresponding series prefix and 4-digit number, and the province in its official 3-letter abbreviation), resulting in a format that reads as AB 1234 PTN or 1AB 1234 BKK. Although the general practice is to use white characters on black, stickers with colour schemes that resemble their original plate colours may also be acceptable; stickers that emulate the layout and colour of the Thai plates have also been known to be used.

To and from Singapore 
Some Malaysian number plate had notably conflicted with the Singapore's W series for engineering plant vehicles and British-sourced 4×4s, Q series for government vehicles, S series for Singapore private vehicles. However Malaysian vehicles registered in this W, Q and S series are not required to be further identified because the Singapore's Land Transport Authority already requires every Malaysian registered vehicle entering Singapore to apply for an Autopass Card which includes all detail of the vehicle, vehicle's owner, and the person who driving the vehicle in their system.

Singapore registered vehicles travelling to Malaysia are required to register the vehicles for the Vehicle Entry Permit (VEP) through the Road Transport Department Malaysia website and VEP registered vehicles will be issued non-transferable VEP-RFID tags which contain pertinent information that uniquely identifies the vehicles. This can only done at Malaysia land checkpoints. Those who have different set of plates, having difficulties to read or using the illegal font (FE-Schrift) will not be allowed through.

Both the tractor and trailer of Malaysian registered semi-trucks are fitted with the "Hazardous Cargo" registrations plates upon entry into Singapore. The same characters of the Malaysian number plates are used, with the only visible changes being the standardised fonts which reflect that of Singapore's and the colour code, which features black characters on an orange background. The "Hazardous Cargo" number plates subject Malaysian semi-trailers to the same laws followed by Singaporean ones.

Buses belonging to Singapore operators that run the cross-border services exclusively have additional brake lights installed and stickers displaying the tax scheme, vehicle specifications, company address, speed limits and SPAD/LPKP hotlines so as to meet the Malaysian regulations.

Examples of overlapping with Singapore series:

'A' (Perak) - SG old motorcycles prefix

'C' (Pahang) - SG School Buses (CB) and City Shuttle Service Buses (CSS) prefixes

MY 'E' series prefix - SG old private cars prefix

'F' (Putrajaya) - SG motorcycles prefix

MY 'G' series prefix - SG Light Goods vehicles prefix

'M' (Malacca) - SG Military Police motorcycles (MP) prefix

'P' (Penang) - SG private buses (PA-PZ) and Pulau Ubin vehicles prefixes

'Q' (Sarawak) - SG old company cars (Q), Private ambulances (QXX) and Government vehicles (QX/QY) prefixes

MY 'R' series prefix - SG Restricted Use (RU) & Research and Development vehicles (RD) prefixes

'S' (Sabah) - SG older cars (SB, SK, SQ, SS, ST) prefixes

Sabah 'SMA-SMZ' - SG 'SMA-SMZ' & SMRT buses (SMB) prefixes

MY 'SMS' - SG 'SMS' prefix

'T' (Terengganu) - SG Traffic Police motorcycles (TP) & SMRT buses (TIB) prefixes

'W' (Kuala Lumpur) - SG Rover/Jeep & Engineering Plant vehicles prefix

MY 'X' series - SG Very Heavy Goods vehicles prefix

MY 'Y' series - SG Heavy Goods vehicles prefix

International "oval" number plate 
Vehicles with Malaysian registration plates intended to be driven in countries beyond neighbouring countries are often required to carry an oval international number plate or sticker denoting the vehicle's country of registration on the rear of the vehicle. The current code for Malaysian international plates, introduced in 1967, is MAL.

Historically, a considerable number of codes were needed to represent the separate Malayan states that would later form Malaysia, undergoing various code changes since the first issue in 1932.

References

Notes 

Malaysia
 Registration plates